Jelena Vujičić  (born 24 January 2001) is a Montenegrin alpine skier. 
She competed in slalom and giant slalom at the 2018 Winter Olympics.

References

2001 births
Living people
Montenegrin female alpine skiers
Olympic alpine skiers of Montenegro
Alpine skiers at the 2018 Winter Olympics
Alpine skiers at the 2022 Winter Olympics